The 42nd Golden Raspberry Awards, or Razzies, was an awards ceremony that honored the worst the film industry had to offer in 2021. It took place on March 26, 2022, in its traditional slot on the day before the Oscars. The awards were based on votes from members of the Golden Raspberry Foundation. The nominations were announced on February 7, 2022.

Worst Performance by Bruce Willis in a 2021 Movie 
This year introduced a special category, "Worst Performance by Bruce Willis in a 2021 Movie", which consists of all eight films that Willis appeared in from 2021. On March 30, 2022, Willis's family announced he was retiring from acting following an aphasia diagnosis. The Razzies originally stood by their decision, tweeting "perhaps this explains why he wanted to go out with a bang in 2021. Our best wishes to Bruce and family". They later rescinded the award in the wake of public backlash, stating that it would be unfair to award a Razzie if a performance was affected by a medical condition beyond the performer's control.

Winners and nominees
The nominees were revealed on February 7, 2022.

Films with multiple nominations 
The following films received multiple nominations:

The following films received multiple wins:

Criticism 

Prior to the ceremony, the Razzies were heavily criticized for overlooking critically panned performances and films, including He's All That and Thunder Force among others, while also nominating mostly unknown films. They also received criticism for lacking actual actor couples in the Worst Screen Combo category and its inclusion for performances by Ben Affleck in the critically acclaimed film The Last Duel and Jared Leto in House of Gucci for Worst Supporting Actor; both performances were nominated, with Leto winning the award. Conversely, Leto received nominations for Best Supporting Actor from the Critics Choice Association and Screen Actors Guild. A reviewer for the website The Avocado was particularly critical of Affleck's nomination, stating that he "gave one of the year's best performances" in The Last Duel, writing: "Was it silly? Of course it was and it was perfect for the role." The same reviewer also criticized Leto's nomination, writing that he "doesn't deserve to be on here either" and arguing that he was "perfectly cast as a pathetic little moron that's in over his head" in House of Gucci. 

In March 2022, after it was announced that Bruce Willis would retire from acting following his diagnosis with aphasia, the special category "Worst Performance by Bruce Willis in a 2021 Movie" incurred criticism as being insensitive. The awards organization initially defended the category, but later announced that they would rescind the category and its nominations, saying "If someone's medical condition is a factor in their decision making and/or their performance, we acknowledge that it is not appropriate to give them a Razzie".

References

External links
 

2021 film awards
2022 awards in the United States
Golden Raspberry Awards ceremonies
March 2022 events in the United States
Bruce Willis